The 2008 SMU Mustangs football team represented Southern Methodist University (SMU) as a member the West Division of Conference USA (C-USA) during the 2008 NCAA Division I FBS football season. Led by first-year head coach June Jones, the Mustangs compiled an overall record of 1–11 with a mark of 0–8 in conference play, placing last of out of six teams in C-USA's West Division. SMU played their home games at Gerald J. Ford Stadium in University Park, Texas.

Previous season
The 2007 team finished with an overall record of 1–11; the team's only win was against North Texas. The Mustangs went 0–8 in conference play, finishing in last place in the Conference USA's West Division. Sixth year head coach Phil Bennett was fired following the team's last game of the season. Bennett finished his tenure at SMU with a record of 18–52 and never had a winning season.

Offseason

Coaching changes
SMU hired June Jones as the program's 17th head coach on January 7, 2008. Jones's contract was worth $2 million, making him the highest paid coach in Conference USA.

Schedule

Roster

Game summaries

at Rice

Texas State

at No. 12 Texas Tech

TCU

References

SMU
SMU Mustangs football seasons
SMU Mustangs football